Pelonium leucophaeum is a species of checkered beetle in the family Cleridae. It is found in Central America and North America.

References

Further reading

External links

 

Cleridae
Articles created by Qbugbot
Beetles described in 1842